The Chilean independence debt was a debt obtained from a large loan the nascent republic of Chile obtained in the last years of its independence war. The loan was obtained in London in 1822 by the government of Bernardo O'Higgins. To address the debt Minister of Finance Manuel Rengifo made first a study to identify all debts incurred before 1830. Chilean agent Francisco Javier Rosales was sent to London to negotiate the payments of the debt in 1836. He was however unable to reach an agreement with the creditors.

Exports of Chilean silver alongside copper and wheat were instrumental to allow Chile cure the default in the 1830s and 1840s. Joaquín Tocornal who succeeded Rengifo as Minister of Finance paid off all the default and refused at the time to take new loans.

References

Economic history of Chile
Government debt
1820s economic history
1830s economic history
1840s economic history